AFGL 2591 is a star forming region in the constellation Cygnus. Its dense cloud of gas and dust make its interior invisible to optical telescopes. Images in the infrared show a bright young stellar object, with an associated reflection nebula seen as a glowing cone projecting from the young star. A cluster of stars is forming within the molecular cloud, but most of the infrared radiation is coming from this star, AFGL 2591-VLA3.

Initially AFGL 2591 was thought to be a single young, massive star expelling clouds of gas and dust in multiple events. It was estimated to be about 10 times the mass of the sun and at a distance of only .

References

Cygnus (constellation)
Molecular clouds
Reflection nebulae
Star-forming regions